The 1965–66 Scottish Cup was the 81st staging of Scotland's most prestigious football knockout competition. The Cup was won by Rangers who defeated Celtic in the replayed final.

Preliminary round 1

Replays

Preliminary round 2

Replays

Second Replays

First round

Replays

Second round

Replays

Quarter-finals

Replays

Semi-finals

Replay

Final

Teams

Replay

Teams

See also
1965–66 in Scottish football
1965–66 Scottish League Cup

References

External links
 Video highlights from official Pathe News archive

Scottish Cup seasons
1965–66 in Scottish football
Scot